The cabinet of Anneli Jäätteenmäki was the 68th government of Finland. The cabinet was in office from 17 April 2003 to 24 June 2003. It was a majority coalition government headed by Prime Minister Anneli Jäätteenmäki. The cabinet was formed by three parties: the Centre Party, the Social Democratic Party, and the Swedish People's Party.

Lasting only 69 days, the Jäätteenmäki cabinet is the fourth-shortest-lived cabinet in Finnish history. The cabinet was dissolved by the Prime Minister due to her involvement in the Iraq leak scandal. The succeeding government, the Vanhanen I Cabinet, was based on the same coalition.

Ministers

|}

References 

Jaatteenmaki
2003 establishments in Finland
2003 disestablishments in Finland
Cabinets established in 2003
Cabinets disestablished in 2003